Espadanedo may refer to the following places in Portugal:

Espadanedo (Cinfães), a parish in the municipality of Cinfães
Espadanedo (Macedo de Cavaleiros), a parish in the municipality of Macedo de Cavaleiros